Eucoenogenes sipanga is a moth of the family Tortricidae that is endemic to Vietnam.

The ground colour of the forewings is brownish cream. The suffusions are indistinct and brownish. The basal half of the costal area and the subcostal, posterior area are distinctly suffused brown. The hindwings are brownish cream.

References

Moths described in 2009
Endemic fauna of Vietnam
Moths of Asia
sipanga
Taxa named by Józef Razowski